Superior Junior/Senior High School is a junior high and high school in Superior, Arizona. It is operated by the Superior Unified School District, which also operates an elementary school. The superintendent of the district is Stephen Estatico.

References

Public high schools in Arizona
Public middle schools in Arizona
Schools in Pinal County, Arizona